Michael R. Weimer is a United States Army command sergeant major who was selected as the next sergeant major of the Army. He currently serves as the command sergeant major at the United States Army Special Operations Command.

Education
Weimer is a graduate of Norwich University, awarded a bachelor's degree in strategic studies and defense analysis.

Military career
This work incorporates material in the public domain in the United States because it is a work of the United States Federal Government under the terms of Title 17, Chapter 1, Section 105 of the US Code.

Weimer joined the Army in 1993, and earned his green beret in 1996. He served as a Special Forces weapons sergeant.

He has served with the 7th Special Forces Group, and 19 years within U.S. Army Special Operations Command (USASOC) including as USASOC’s operations (G3) sergeant major, with tours in the U.S. Central Command and U.S. Southern Command areas of responsibility.

On 13 August 2021, Weimer was sworn in as Command Sergeant Major of United States Army Special Operations Command, in the change of command ceremony for Lt. Gen. Jonathan P. Braga.

Awards
Weimer has, among other awards:

Family
Weimer is married and has two children.

References

1970s births
Living people
Members of the United States Army Special Forces
Norwich University alumni
Recipients of the Defense Superior Service Medal
Recipients of the Legion of Merit
Sergeants Major of the Army